John Sicklemore (c. 16121670) was an English politician.

Sicklemore was M.P. for Ipswich, between 1661 and his death in 1670. He served with William Blois.

Notes

1610s births
1670 deaths
Members of the Parliament of England (pre-1707) for Ipswich
English MPs 1661–1679